Damirchilu (also Romanized as Damīrchīlū; also known as Damīrchelū) is a village in Gowg Tappeh Rural District, in the Central District of Bileh Savar County, Ardabil Province, Iran. At the 2006 census, its population was 430, in 88 families.

References 

Towns and villages in Bileh Savar County